Colebrook is an unincorporated community in South Londonderry Township in Lebanon County, Pennsylvania, United States. Colebrook is located at the intersection of Pennsylvania Route 117 and Mount Wilson Road just to the south of Pennsylvania Route 241.

References

Unincorporated communities in Lebanon County, Pennsylvania
Unincorporated communities in Pennsylvania